is a Japanese football player. She plays for Albirex Niigata. She played for Japan national team.

Club career
Obara was born in Towada on September 4, 1990. After graduating from high school, she joined Albirex Niigata in 2009.

National team career
In July 2010, Obara was selected Japan U-20 national team for 2010 U-20 World Cup. In May 2014, she was selected Japan national team for 2014 Asian Cup. At this competition, on May 18, she debuted against Jordan. Japan won the championship.

National team statistics

References

External links

Albirex Niigata

1990 births
Living people
People from Towada, Aomori
Niigata University of Health and Welfare alumni
Association football people from Aomori Prefecture
Japanese women's footballers
Japan women's international footballers
Nadeshiko League players
Albirex Niigata Ladies players
Women's association football defenders